The Reapers' War, also known as the Catalan Revolt, was a conflict that affected the Principality of Catalonia between the years of 1640 and 1659. It had an enduring effect in the Treaty of the Pyrenees (1659), which ceded the County of Roussillon and the northern half of the County of Cerdanya to France (see French Cerdagne), splitting these northern Catalan territories off from the Principality of Catalonia and the Crown of Aragon, and thereby receding the borders of Spain to the Pyrenees.

Background

The war had its roots in the discomfort generated in Catalan society by the presence of the royal army (made mostly of mercenaries from different nationalities) during the Franco-Spanish War between the Kingdom of France and the Monarchy of Spain as part of the Thirty Years' War, as well the opposition of Catalan institutions to the centralised policies of the Royal Court.

Gaspar de Guzmán, Count-Duke of Olivares, the chief minister of Philip IV, had been trying to distribute more evenly the huge economic and military burden of the Spanish Empire. But his Union of Arms (Spanish: Union de Armas) policy raised hostilities and protests all across the states of the Monarchy of Spain. Resistance in Catalonia was especially strong; the Catalan Courts of 1626 and 1632 were never concluded, due to the opposition of the states against the economic and military measures of Olivares, many of which violated the Catalan constitutions.

In 1638, the canon of La Seu d'Urgell Pau Claris, known for his opposition to non-Catalan bishops who collaborated with the Crown, was elected by the ecclesiastic estate as president of the Generalitat, with Francesc de Tamarit elected member of the Generalitat by the military estate and Josep-Miquel Quintana Torroella by the popular estate. Around 1639, both causes approached and the identification and solidarity of the peasants took place with the attitude of political distrust of the authorities. Thus the political doctrine of the uprising and the popular ideology of the revolt were formed.

Catalan peasants, who were forced to quarter the royal army and reported events such as religious sacrileges, destruction of personal properties and rape of women by the soldiers, responded in a series of local rebellions against their presence.

The revolt grew, until the Corpus Christi day of May 1640 in Barcelona, with an uprising known as 'Bloody Corpus' (Catalan: Corpus de Sang), under the slogans "Long live the faith of Christ!", "The King our Lord has declared war on us!" "Long live the land, death to bad government", "Reap our chains". When the bishop of Barcelona, after blessing the furious crowd, asked them: "Who is your captain? What is your flag?" They raised a big Christ on the Cross statue covered with an all black cloth and shouted "Here is our captain, this is our flag!". This 'Bloody Corpus' which began with the death of a reaper (Catalan: segador),  and led to the assassination by Catalan rebels of the Spanish Viceroy of Catalonia, the second Count of Santa Coloma, marked the beginning of the conflict. The irregular militia involved were known as "Miquelets". The situation took Olivares by surprise, with most of the Spanish army fighting on other fronts far from Catalonia. The Council of Aragon demanded more military presence in Barcelona as the only way to restore the order.

Conflict
Pau Claris, President of the Generalitat of Catalonia, called the politician members of the all Principality in order to form a Junta de Braços or Braços Generals (States-General), a consultive body. The calling was a success, and the presence of royal cities and feudal villages was exceptionally large. This assembly, which worked with individual voting, began to create and apply various revolutionary measures, such as the establishment of a Council of Defense of the Principality and a special tax for the nobility (the Batalló), while the tension with the monarchy grew.

At the same time, the Generalitat maintained contacts with France, in order to establish an alliance between the Principality of Catalonia and this country. By the pact of Ceret, French promised to help the Principality. In this way, the States-General presided by Pau Claris proclaimed the Catalan Republic under the protection of the French monarchy, on 17 January 1641, which lasted a week until 21 January 1641, when they declared the French king Louis XIII count of Barcelona.

The threat of the French enemy establishing a powerful base south of the Pyrenees caused an immediate reaction from the Habsburg monarchy. The Habsburg government sent a large army of 26,000 men under Pedro Fajardo to crush the Catalan Revolt. On its way to Barcelona, the Spanish army retook several cities, executing hundreds of prisoners, and a rebel army of the Catalan Republic was defeated in Martorell, near Barcelona, on 23 January. In response the Catalans reinforced their efforts and the Franco-Catalan armies obtained an important military victory over the Spanish army in the Battle of Montjuïc (26 January 1641).

Despite this success, the peasant uprising was becoming uncontrollable in some places, progressively focusing on the Catalan nobility and Generalitat itself. In effect, the conflict was also a class war, with the peasants revolting both against the Habsburg monarchy and against their own ruling classes, which turned to France for support. For the next decade the Catalans fought under French vassalage, taking the initiative after Montjuïc. Meanwhile, increasing French control of political and administrative affairs (maritime ports, taxes, key bureaucratic positions, etc.) and a firm military focus on the neighbouring Spanish kingdoms of Valencia and Aragon, in line with Richelieu's war against Spain, gradually undermined Catalan enthusiasm for the French.
 
A Franco-Catalan army under Philippe de La Mothe-Houdancourt moved south and gained several victories against the Spanish, but the sieges of Tarragona (1644), Lleida and Tortosa finally failed and the allies had to withdraw.

In the north of Catalonia in Roussillon, they were more successful. Perpignan was taken from the Spanish after a siege of 10 months, and the whole of Roussillon was under French control. Shortly after, Spanish relief armies were defeated at the Battle of Montmeló and Battle of Barcelona.
  
In 1652, a Spanish offensive captured Barcelona bringing the Catalan capital under Spanish control again. Irregular resistance continued for several years afterwards and some fighting took place north of the Pyrenees but the mountains would remain from then on the effective border between Spanish and French territories.

The war was concurrent with the Arauco War in Chile where the Spanish fought a coalition of native Mapuches. With the Arauco War being a lengthy and costly conflict, the Spanish crown ordered its authorities in Chile to sign a peace agreement with the Mapuche in order to concentrate the empire's resources in fighting the Catalans. This way the Mapuche obtained a peace treaty and a recognition on behalf of the crown in a case unique for any indigenous group in the Americas.

Resolution

The conflict extended beyond the Peace of Westphalia, which concluded the Thirty Years' War in 1648 but remained part of the Franco-Spanish War (1635–1659) with the confrontation between two sovereigns and two Generalitats, one based in Barcelona, under the control of Spain and the other in Perpinyà (Perpignan), under the occupation of France. In 1652 the French authorities renounced Catalonia, but held control of Roussillon, thereby leading to the signing of the Treaty of the Pyrenees in 1659.

Spanish troops being busy in Catalonia considerably helped Portugal, on the other side of the Iberian Peninsula, in successfully shaking off Spanish rule and winning its Restoration War at the same time.

See also

 "Els Segadors" ("The Reapers"), the official national anthem of Catalonia. The current lyrics are from 1899, originally based in this revolt.
 The Fronde, French uprising between 1648 and 1653 that was supported by Spain
 Revolt of the Barretines, another Catalan revolt from 1687–1689.
 Slovak Uprising of 1848–49, a similar revolt in Slovakia from 1848 to 1849.
 Joan Pere Fontanella, Catalan judge and advocate

References

Sources
 J. Sanabre. La acción de Francia en Cataluña en la pugna por la hegemonía de Europa (1640-1659). Barcelona, 1956. Still indispensable for its detailed coverage of the events from 1640/41 and later.
 J.H. Elliott. The Revolt of the Catalans: a Study in the Decline of Spain (1598-1640). Cambridge, 1963.
 Serra, Eva. La guerra dels segadors. Ed. Bruguera (Barcelona, 1966)

External links 
 Museum exhibit with online information

 
1640s conflicts
1650s conflicts
1640s in Spain
1650s in Spain
Principality of Catalonia
Military history of Catalonia
Early Modern Catalonia
Thirty Years' War
Rebellions in Spain
Violence against indigenous peoples
17th-century rebellions